The women's 800 metres event at the 2003 IAAF World Indoor Championships was held on March 14–16.

Medalists

Results

Heats
First 2 of each heat (Q) and next 4 fastest (q) qualified for the semifinals.

Semifinals
First 3 of each semifinal (Q) qualified directly for the final.

Final

Note: Yekaterina Puzanova who had originally finished sixth was later disqualified for steroid use.

References
Results

800
800 metres at the World Athletics Indoor Championships
2003 in women's athletics